A bib is a garment worn hanging from the neck on the chest to protect clothing from accidentally spilled food. Bibs are frequently used by young children, especially infants, but also by some adults. Bibs are also worn when consuming certain "messy" foods. In addition, bibs are used for infants when they drool a lot, for example when they are teething. In addition some adults wear a bib when they are eating some messy foods, like tomato spagheti or lobster. 

A bib may also refer to the part of a garment that covers the chest, a garment that used by a team to identify themselves on the field of play, a lead covering used to prevent X-ray radiation from reaching parts of the body not being X-rayed.

Etymology
The word, reported in English since 1580, probably stems from the verb bibben "to drink" (c.1380), from the Latin bibere, either because it was worn while drinking or because it "soaked up" spills.

Other uses

Part of garment

The term bib may also refer to the part of a garment that covers the chest. For instance, an apron that covers the chest may be referred to as a bib apron. The part of a jumper dress or of a pair of overalls that covers the chest may also be referred to as a bib.

Sports

In sport, it may refer to a garment that used by a team to identify themselves on the field of play (a jersey), or to identify a participant in a competition with a start number ("bib number"). In netball, bibs are used by the umpire to identify players' positions so it can be determined who is within their allowed area.

Medical
Paper bibs are also commonly used in dentist offices to protect the patient's clothing during checkups and cleanings. Another medical use is during an x-ray, a lead bib can be put over a patient to prevent the radiation from reaching parts other than the part of the body being tested

For adults 
Some adults wear a bib at every meal but most people don't. Most adults wear a bib when they are eating messy foods like tomato spaghetti or lobster or crab.

NEATsheets

A company called NEATgoods created a napkin with adhesive tabs at the back to adhere to the shirt to use as a bib or use it on the lap.

See also
 Apron
 Bib shorts
 Dudou and Yếm, East Asian clothing sometimes translated as bibs

References

External links

EtymologyOnLine

Safety clothing
Children's clothing
Aprons